Justice Fitzgerald may refer to:

Justices of states of the United States
Adolphus L. Fitzgerald, justice of the Supreme Court of Nevada
James J. Fitzgerald III, justice of the Supreme Court of Pennsylvania
James Martin Fitzgerald (1920–2011), justice of the Alaska Supreme Court
John Warner Fitzgerald (1924–2006), chief justice of the Michigan Supreme Court
Thomas R. Fitzgerald (judge) (1941–2015), chief justice of the Illinois Supreme Court
William F. Fitzgerald (1846–1903), justice of the California Supreme Court

Lord Justices of Ireland
Maurice FitzGerald, 2nd Lord of Offaly (1194–1257), Lord Chief Justice of Ireland
Maurice FitzGerald, 1st Earl of Desmond (died 1356), briefly Lord Justice of Ireland
Robert FitzGerald, 19th Earl of Kildare (1675–1743), Lord Justice of Ireland
Thomas FitzGerald, 2nd Earl of Kildare (died 1328), Lord Justice of Ireland
Thomas FitzGerald, 7th Earl of Kildare (1421–1477), Lord Justice of Ireland

Others
Tony Fitzgerald (born 1941), justice of the Supreme Court of Queensland
William James Fitzgerald (jurist) (1894–1989), chief justice of Palestine during the time of the British Mandate